George Halley (29 October 1887 – 18 December 1941) was a Scottish professional footballer who made 220 appearances as a right half in the Football League for Burnley, Bradford (Park Avenue) and Southend United. He also played in the Scottish League for Kilmarnock and represented the Scottish League XI.

Club career 
A right half, Halley began his senior career with Scottish League Division One club Kilmarnock in 1907 and moved to England in 1911, where, either side of the First World War, he made 220 appearances in the Football League for Burnley, Bradford (Park Avenue) and Southend United. While with Burnley, he was a part of the teams that won the 1913–14 FA Cup and the 1920–21 First Division title. Halley's professional career ended in 1924.

Representative career 
Halley was capped by the Scottish League XI in 1910. During his long spell in England, he was selected for the Home Scots v Anglo-Scots international trial on three occasions (1913, 1914, 1922), without it leading to a full cap.

Personal life 
Halley served in the British Army prior to the First World War. He served as a sapper in the Royal Engineers during the war and saw action in France and Mesopotamia, before being posted to India in 1919. After his retirement from football, Halley worked as a plasterer and studied at Ruskin College, Oxford. He died at Victoria Hospital, Burnley on 18 December 1941.

Honours 
Burnley

 Football League First Division: 1920-21
 FA Cup: 1913–14

Career statistics

References

1887 births
1941 deaths
Footballers from East Ayrshire
Scottish footballers
Association football wing halves
Bradford (Park Avenue) A.F.C. players
Burnley F.C. players
Southend United F.C. players
Bacup Borough F.C. players
English Football League players
Kilmarnock F.C. players
Scottish Football League players
Scottish Football League representative players
Glenbuck Cherrypickers F.C. players
Association football fullbacks
British Army personnel of World War I
Royal Engineers soldiers
Scottish Junior Football Association players
FA Cup Final players